The name Marilyn has been used for one tropical cyclone in Atlantic Ocean and two in the Philippines by the PAGASA in the Western Pacific Ocean.

In the Atlantic:
Hurricane Marilyn (1995) – Category 3 hurricane that caused significant damage in the Leeward Islands.

The name was retired in the Atlantic basin after the 1995 hurricane season and replaced with Michelle.

In the Western Pacific:
 Typhoon In-fa (2015) (T1526, 27W, Marilyn) – a strong typhoon, but stayed out in sea.
 Tropical Depression Marilyn (2019) – a weak system that drifted over the open sea before dissipating.

Atlantic hurricane set index articles
Pacific typhoon set index articles